Wictor Emmanuel Dias (born 23 August 2000) is a Brazilian professional footballer.

References

External links 
 
 Profile at Energetik-BGU Minsk website

2000 births
Living people
Brazilian footballers
Brazilian expatriate footballers
Expatriate footballers in Belarus
Association football midfielders
FC Energetik-BGU Minsk players
Sportspeople from Mato Grosso do Sul